McIntire High School is a now-closed high school built in the early twentieth century by the Public Works Administration, with funding by Charlottesville philanthropist Paul Goodloe McIntire. It now houses a private Christian school, The Covenant School. The structure is a two-story building, made of brick, with a tetrastyle portico, fluted columns, and grouped windows.

References

Schools in Charlottesville, Virginia